Paul-Marie Yembit (22 December 1917 – 21 January 1978) was the first vice president of Gabon under Léon M'ba.

A member of the Bapounou people, he was born in the village of Moussambou and educated in local Catholic schools, then at the public secondary school of Lambaréné. He was a businessman in Mouila from 1943 to 1952, then was elected to the Territorial Assembly, representing Ngounié Province. In March 1957, he was re-elected to the Legislative Assembly. A member of the Gabonese Democratic Bloc, he also became Minister of Agriculture and Livestock in March 1957, later holding ministerial posts until becoming vice president in February 1961. M'ba replaced Yembit with Omar Bongo in November 1966, and had elections held the following year to confirm Bongo's position.

Yembit died in Libreville on 21 January 1978, aged 60.

Notes

References
.
.

1917 births
1978 deaths
People of French Equatorial Africa
Vice presidents of Gabon
Government ministers of Gabon
Gabonese Democratic Party politicians
People from Ngounié Province